Jugyo-dong is a legal dong, or neighbourhood of the Jung-gu district in Seoul, South Korea. It is governed by its administrative dong, Euljiro 3, 4, 5ga-dong.

Geography 
Most of the area is hilly with a gentle slope. It has been designated as a development restricted area. 

The administrative and legal names are the same. Villages include Masanggol, Park Jaegung, Witbaedari, Utmal, and Ijakgol. It is an administrative dong in the northwest of Deokyang-gu, Goyang-si, Gyeonggi-do.

History
The name jugyo-ri (舟橋) appears for the first time in Goyang Gunji, published during the Joseon Dynasty. It is said that Parkjaegungchon, Lee Inggok, Sageunjeol, and Seongrashinchon lived in the bishop's village, along with the record 'jugyo-ri' village in Wondang-myeon (元堂面) Lee Pa-ri'. In the Local Map of 1872, it is marked as Jugyo-ri in the central part of Goyang-gun. Lee Par-ri was changed to Park Jae-gung, Bishop Sang-ri, Bishop Hari, Sageun-sari, and Sampa-ri due to the reorganization of administrative districts in 1906. In 1914 it was Jugyo-ri, Wondang-myeon, Goyang-gun. 

Due to the great flood in 1925, a boat was washed down to this village. Another theory is that this is because the topography of the village is shaped like a ship. Therefore, the name of jugyo-dong can be considered as the Chinese character of Baedari. Currently, there is a natural village called Witbaedari, the bishop's Hangeul place name.

In 1979, it became Jugyo-ri, Wondang-eup, and with the promotion to Goyang-si in 1992, it became an administrative dong that had jurisdiction over Jugyo-dong and Seongsa-dong. The name Jugyo-Dong. Before the construction of the Han River embankment in the early 1930s, a river led to the Han River in front of the village. 

In 1996, when relief was implemented, it became the jurisdiction of Deokyang-gu. 
Since 1914, Wondang-myeon, Wondang-eup, and Wondang-gun have been the center of local administration, and even today, it occupies an important role as the administrative seat of Goyang City.

There are Wonneung Station, Goyang City Hall, and public health center, and transportation is convenient as the Seoul Suburban Railway, National Road 39, Local Road 310, and the Seoul Outer Ring Expressway intersect.

Statistics 
Area  5.62 km2 
Population  2,791 people as of 2009

See also 
Administrative divisions of South Korea
 Jugyo-dong

References

 Wondang District 1, Jugyo-dong Redevelopment Progress
 Sep 2007: Designation of maintenance area
 December 2010: Approval by the Promotion Committee
 August 2011: Approval of establishment of association
 September 2015: Approval for business implementation
 August 2021: Approval for administrative disposition
 Second half of 2022: Relocation to be completed
 Second half of 2026: expected to move in

External links

External links
 Jung-gu Official site in English
 Jung-gu Official site
 Jung-gu Tour Guide from the Official site
 Status quo of Jung-gu 
 Resident offices and maps of Jung-gu 
Goyang City Hall

Map of Deokyang-gu, Goyang-si, Gyeonggi-do  

Neighbourhoods of Jung-gu, Seoul

GTX운정역 서희스타힐스 GTX창릉역 힐사이드파크 더블 양주 회정역 파밀리에 장흥역 경남아너스빌  전곡역 제일풍경채 리버파크 음성 푸르지오 마크베르 힐스테이트 과천 디센트로 포항 한신더휴 펜타시티 분양